The Fondazione Roberto Longhi is an institute established by Italian scholar Roberto Longhi. It is located on Via Benedetto Fortini in Florence, Tuscany, Italy.

History
The headquarters is the villa "Il Tasso" which Longhi acquired in 1939. This villa was the residence of Longhi and his wife Lucia Lopresti (the writer Anna Banti). The Foundation's preferred sphere of interest is art historical research. It also focuses on artists and specific artistic themes, including contemporary art and artists. The museum (pinacoteca) of the Foundation is open only to scholars and by appointment.

Activities
The Foundation's activities include art exhibits, publications, lessons, conferences, seminars, and scholarly meetings. These meetings are organized on a periodic basis and are generally of an international and interdisciplinary nature.

Each year the Foundation grants a series of fellowships to young Italian and foreign scholars selected on the basis of a competition.   Since 1971, 300 young scholars have been granted a fellowship by the Longhi Foundation. Many of them now work in renowned museums or are professors in important Italian and foreign universities.

External links
Website for Fondazione Roberto Longhi

Arts centres in Italy
Art museums and galleries in Florence
Arts foundations based in Europe
Arts organisations based in Italy
Culture in Florence
Cultural organisations based in Italy
Foundations based in Italy
Arts organizations established in 1971
1971 establishments in Italy
Arts foundations based in Italy